John G. Lenic (born October 11, 1974 in New Westminster, British Columbia) is a Canadian television producer and production manage He is of Croatian descent.

Filmography
 Deceived by Trust: A Moment of Truth Movie (1995) (TV) (assistant producer)
 Expert Witness (1996) (producer)
 Justice for Annie: A Moment of Truth Movie (1996) (TV) (assistant producer)
 When Friendship Kills (1996) (TV) (assistant producer)
 She Woke Up Pregnant (1996) (TV) (assistant producer)
 Abduction of Innocence (1996) (TV) (assistant producer)
 Stand Against Fear (1996) (TV) (assistant producer)
 Moment of Truth: Into the Arms of Danger (1997) (TV) (assistant producer)
 Nobody Lives Forever (1998) (TV) (assistant producer)
 A Dog's Breakfast (2007) (producer)
 Stargate SG-1 (2004-2007) (producer) 
 Stargate: Atlantis (2007-2008) (producer)
 Stargate: The Ark of Truth (2008) (producer)
 Stargate: Continuum (2008) (producer)
 Altered Carbon (2018) (producer)
 Travellers'' (2019) (producer)

External links 

1974 births
Living people
Canadian television producers